Albert Bateman (13 June 1924 – 23 April 2020) was an English professional footballer, who played for Huddersfield Town. He was born in Stocksbridge, Sheffield, Yorkshire. At the time of his death, Bateman was the oldest living former Huddersfield Town player.

References

1924 births
2020 deaths
Footballers from Sheffield
English footballers
Association football midfielders
English Football League players
Huddersfield Town A.F.C. players
People from Stocksbridge